The Reunion giant tortoise (Cylindraspis indica) is an extinct species of giant tortoise in the family Testudinidae.  It was endemic to Réunion Island in the Indian Ocean.

This giant tortoise was numerous in the 17th and early 18th centuries. They were killed in vast numbers by European sailors, and finally became extinct in the 1840s.

Description
The Réunion giant tortoise was 50 to 110 cm long. It was the largest of the Cylindraspis giant tortoise species of the Mascarenes. It was roughly the same size as modern Aldabra giant and Galapagos giant tortoises, though it was a longer and more elongated animal.

It had long legs and a long neck which supported a large head with powerful, strongly-serrated jaws. The species was sexually dimorphic, in that males were noticeably larger than females.

It was also a highly variable species. A problem arises when identifying this species because it appears there were domed variants as well as saddle-backed variants.

Distribution
This species was endemic to Réunion. On this island it was naturally extremely numerous, and its vast herds provided an important role in the health and rejuvenation of the indigenous forests.

Extinction

These giant tortoises were very friendly, curious, and had no fear of humans. They were, therefore, easy prey for the first inhabitants of the island, and were slaughtered in vast numbers to be burnt for fat and oil, or to be used as food (for humans or pigs). Large numbers were also stacked into the holds of passing ships, as food supplies for sea trips.

In addition, invasive species, such as pigs, cats, and rats, destroyed the eggs and hatchlings of the giant tortoises.

Coastal populations were completely decimated by the 18th century. It was presumed extinct in much of the island since 1800, with the last specimen observed in Upper Cilaos. The last few animals survived in the highlands until the 1840s.

References

Cylindraspis
Reptile extinctions since 1500
Endemic fauna of Réunion
Vertebrates of Réunion
Extinct turtles
Reptiles described in 1783
Species endangered by invasive species
Species endangered by use as food
Species made extinct by human activities
Taxonomy articles created by Polbot